Rhagadolobium is a genus of fungi in the family Parmulariaceae.

Species 

 Rhagadolobium ambiguum
 Rhagadolobium bakeri
 Rhagadolobium bakerianum
 Rhagadolobium cucurbitacearum
 Rhagadolobium dicksoniifolium
 Rhagadolobium filicum
 Rhagadolobium hemitheliae
 Rhagadolobium longissimum
 Rhagadolobium pteridis
 Rhagadolobium pulchellum
 Rhagadolobium stenochlaenae

References

External links 

Rhagadolobium at Index Fungorum

Parmulariaceae
Taxa named by Paul Christoph Hennings
Taxa named by Gustav Lindau